Lille Strandstræde 3 is a Neoclassical property in the Nyhavn Quarter of central Copenhagen, Denmark. The building was listed in the Danish registry of protected buildings and places in 1979.

History

18th century
The property was listed as No. 30 in St. Ann's East Quarter (Sankt Annæ Øster Kvarter) in Copenhagen's first cadastre of 1689. It was at that time  owned by beer seller (øltapper) Peder Christensen. It was listed as No. 106 ,in the new cadastre of 1756 and was then owned by brewery worker (bryggersvend) Niels Christensen.

The present building on the site was constructed in 1785 for distiller Iver Andersen Buck

Buch's property was home to 22 residents in six households at the time of the 1787 census. Iver Buch resided in the building with his wife Johanna Margrethe, their two-year-old son Christian Anders, one maidm one male servant  and one lodger. Niels P.Lund, an innkeeper, resided in the building with his wife Maren Christians Datter, their one-year-old daughter and one maid. Hans Jørgen Sonne, a skipper, resided in the building with his wife Kierstine	 and their two children (aged two and five). Ancher Madsen, a miller, resided in the building with his wife Else Marie. Søren Hansen Rabe, another skipper, resided in the building with his wife Dorthe Jens Datter and one maid. Kerstine Fenne, a 42-year-old widow, resided in the building with her four-year-old son and one maid.

19th century
The new building was home to 39 residents in six households at the 1801 census. Lars Christensen Olding, a brewer and distiller, resided  in the building with his wife Else Rasmusdatter, their two-year-old son, a caretaker, a maid and three lodgers (a skipper and two sailors). Niels Lund, a grocer (spækhøker), resided in the building with his wife Maren Lund and their four children (aged seven to 14). A third household was made up of five sailors (aged 24 to 44) and one maid (associated Lund's household). Jesper Rosenberg, a shoemaker, resided in the building with his wife Ane Krag, their 17-year-old daughter, three shoemakers and two shoemaker's apprentices. Tulesen Møller, a lawyer (procurator), resided in the building with his wife Helene Sophie Møller and their two children (aged four and seven). Hans Møller, a skipper, resided in the building with his wife Elisabeth Møller, their one-year-old son, two relatives (aged 50 and 12) and two maids.
 
IThe property was listed in the new cadastre of 1806 as No. 73 in St. Ann's East Quarter. It was still owned by Lars Christensen Olling at that time. He was at this point no longer registered as a brewer and distiller but instead as a grocer (høker).

The property was home to 27 residents in five households at the 1834 census. Johanne Charlotte Louise Studsgaard, wife of a customs officer in Helsingør, resided on the ground floor with her four children (aged two to 13), three lodgers and one maid. Andreas Hermansen Holm, an office clerk, resided in the building with his wife Anna Maria Holm, one maid and one lodger. Magretha Clausen, a 36-year-old widow, resided on the second floor with her four children (aged two to 10), another 14-year-old girl in her care and one maid. Carl Gottlob Stelzner, a portrait painter, resided on the second floor with his daughter Caroline Amalie Stettzner. Christian Larsen Smith, an instrumentmaker, resided on the second floor with his wife Kristiane Dorthe Schmidt, their two children (aged one and three) and one lodger.

Architecture
The building is constructed with four storeys over a walk-out basement  and is seven bays wide. The fourth storey was added in 1832. The acanthus frieze below the windows on the first floor was also added at this point.

A three-storey narrow perpendicular side wing extends from the rear side of the building. The side wing and the rear side of the main wing are both rendered in a red colour.

Today
The building is today owned by lawyer Wilhelm Mule Malling.

References

External links

Listed residential buildings in Copenhagen
Residential buildings completed in 1785
1785 establishments in Denmark